Weigle is a German surname.

Edwin F. Weigle (1901–1973), Dutch engineer and politician
George J. Weigle (1871–1956), member of the Wisconsin State Senate
Gottfried Weigle (1816–1855), German missionary
Jean Weigle (1901–1968), Swiss molecular biologist
Jörg-Peter Weigle (born 1953), German conductor and music professor
Kent Weigle (born 1955), American ice dancer
Mark Weigle (born 1967) American singer and songwriter
Sebastian Weigle (born 1961), German conductor

German-language surnames
Surnames

de:Grasshoff